Battle for Earth may refer to:
 Transformers: Battle for Earth, a book in the Transformers franchise.
 Avengers: Battle for Earth, a 2012 motion-controlled fighting video game

See also
Battle of Earth (disambiguation)